Kalateh-ye Samad Khan (also Romanized as Kalāteh-ye Şamad Khān and Kalāteh Şamad Khān; also known as Kalāteh-ye Şamad) is a village in Jannatabad Rural District, Salehabad County, Razavi Khorasan Province, Iran. At the 2006 census, its population was 302, in 56 families.

References 

Populated places in   Torbat-e Jam County